Xanthoparmelia convoluta is a vagrant lichen in the family Parmeliaceae found in Australia. It lacks rhizenes that hold it to a substrate, so it lives its life moving about in the wind.

Taxonomy
First described as Parmelia conspersa f. convoluta in 1871 by Gottlob Ludwig Rabenhorst, it was elevated from form to species in 1880 by August von Krempelhuber and was subsequently one of 93 species transferred to the genus Xanthoparmelia by Mason Hale 1974.

See also
List of Xanthoparmelia species

References

convoluta
Lichen species
Lichens of Australia
Lichens described in 1880
Taxa named by August von Krempelhuber